The Scottish Fantasy in E-flat major, Op. 46, is a composition for violin and orchestra by Max Bruch.  Completed in 1880, it was dedicated to the virtuoso violinist Pablo de Sarasate.

It is a four-movement fantasy on Scottish folk melodies. The first movement is built on "Through the Wood Laddie".  This tune also appears at the end of the second and fourth movements. The second movement is built around "The Dusty Miller", the third on "I'm A' Doun for Lack O' Johnnie", and the fourth movement includes a sprightly arrangement of "Hey Tuttie Tatie", the tune in the patriotic anthem "Scots Wha Hae" (with lyrics by Robert Burns).

Although Bruch visited Scotland for the first time only a year after the premiere of the work, he had access to a collection of Scottish music at Munich library in 1868. In paying homage to Scottish tradition, the work gives a prominent place to the harp in the instrumental accompaniment to the violin. The Scottish Fantasy is one of several signature pieces by Bruch that is still widely heard today, along with his first violin concerto and Kol Nidrei for cello and orchestra.

Composition

Bruch composed the work in Berlin during the winter of 1879–1880. Despite the dedication to Sarasate, Joseph Joachim was involved in the fingering and bowing of the solo part.  It was published by Simrock as Fantasie: für die Violine mit Orchester und Harfe unter freier Benutzung schottischer Volksmelodien, Op. 46.

Premiere
 
The premiere was in Liverpool on 22 February 1881 with Bruch (who was then director of the Liverpool Philharmonic Society) conducting, and Joachim as the soloist. Bruch was unhappy with Joachim’s performance, describing him as having "ruined" the work. When Bruch conducted the work with Sarasate as the soloist at a Philharmonic Society concert in St. James’s Hall on 15 March 1883, it was titled Concerto for Violin (Scotch). At a concert that Bruch conducted in Breslau, also with Sarasate as the soloist, the work was titled Third Violin Concerto (with free use of Scottish melodies, Op. 46).

Movements
The opus consists of the following movements:

Instrumentation
The work is scored for solo violin, 2 flutes, 2 oboes, 2 clarinets, 
2 bassoons, 4 horns, 2 trumpets, 3 trombones, tuba, timpani, bass drum, suspended cymbal (played with triangle beater), harp, and strings.

Notable recordings

Many famous violinists have recorded the work, including Jascha Heifetz (1947 and 1961), Michael Rabin (1957), David Oistrakh (1962), Kyung Wha Chung (1972), Arthur Grumiaux (1973), Salvatore Accardo (1977), Ruggiero Ricci (live, 1980s), Cho-Liang Lin (1986), Itzhak Perlman (1986), Anne Akiko Meyers (1992), Vanessa-Mae (1996), Akiko Suwanai (1997), James Ehnes (2003), Rachel Barton Pine (2004), Aaron Rosand (2007), Nicola Benedetti (2014), Stefan Jackiw (2014), and Joshua Bell (2018).

An excerpt, recomposed by Jay Chattaway, was played by the character Jean-Luc Picard in The Inner Light (Star Trek: The Next Generation).

References
Notes

Sources

External links
 

Compositions by Max Bruch
Compositions for violin and orchestra
1880 compositions
Compositions in E-flat major
Music dedicated to ensembles or performers
Bruch